Nareh (Nä-reh), also spelled Nare or Nara, is an Armenian feminine given name, a short form of the Armenian names Gyulnara or Narineh. The Armenian root word "nar" refers to either pomegranate or fire. Nare is among the top 10 most popular names given to newborn girls in Armenia in 2012.

Notes

Armenian feminine given names
Given names derived from plants or flowers